Archduke Leopold Ludwig of Austria (German: Leopold Ludwig Maria Franz Julius Estorgius Gerhard Erzherzog von Österreich) (b. Milan 6 June 1823 – d. Hórnstein 24 May 1898) was an Austrian general and admiral.

Life
He was the eldest son of Archduke Rainer Joseph of Austria (1783–1853) and Princess Elisabeth of Savoy (1800–1856) and a grandson of Emperor Leopold II. Leopold Ludwig was born in 1823 in Milan, where his father served as Viceroy of Lombardy-Venetia from 1818 to 1848. A younger brother, Archduke Rainer Ferdinand (1827–1913), served as Austrian Minister President from 1859 to 1861. Leopold followed his father in a military career, attaining the rank of Feldmarschall-leutnant (lieutenant general) in the Austrian Army. 

When Archduke Ferdinand Maximilian was preparing to accept the throne of Mexico in March 1864, Emperor Franz Josef I sent Leopold to Miramar to induce Maximilian to sign the Act of Renunciation. The two cousins had never been on friendly terms, and Maximilian viewed Leopold as one of the archdukes who would benefit from the renunciation of his hereditary rights in Austria. Maximilian delayed signing the 'Family Compact', as it was called, until the visit of Franz Josef to Miramar on 9 April 1864.

Undoubtedly to Maximilian's chagrin and irritation, Leopold was promoted to the rank of Viceadmiral in the Austro-Hungarian Navy and acted as Inspektor General of the Marinetroops and the fleet from 1865 up till 25 February 1868.

During the Austro-Prussian War the Archduke Leopold was given command of the Austrian VIII Corps. According to Wawro the Archduke was an incompetent princely commander who during the Battle of Skalitz, where his corps was severely mauled by the Prussian V Corps under Steinmetz, didn’t give a single order. Before the battle of Königgrätz the Archduke was replaced as corps commander by general Weber.

Leopold never married, and after stepping down as head of the Navy he faded into obscurity. He died at Hörnstein on 24 May 1898.

Ancestry

Notes

1823 births
1898 deaths
House of Habsburg-Lorraine
Austro-Hungarian admirals
Austrian princes
Knights of the Golden Fleece of Austria
Grand Crosses of the Order of Saint Stephen of Hungary
Nobility from Milan
Burials at the Imperial Crypt